Christopher Philip Wood (born 27 June 1990) is an English first-class cricketer. 

He currently plays for Hampshire. Wood is a right-handed batsman who bowls left-arm medium pace.

Wood has represented the England U-19 cricket team, playing two Youth Test matches, nine Youth One Day Internationals, and a single Youth Twenty20 International.

Wood made his first-class debut for Hampshire against Oxford University at University Parks, Oxford in the 2010 English cricket season. During the match, Wood took his maiden five wicket haul with figures of 5/54. He made his List-A debut against Warwickshire on 14 May in the 2010 Clydesdale Bank 40.

Wood scored his second first-class fifty against Worcestershire at New Road on 12/09/13.  He shared an 81 run seventh wicket partnership with youngster Sean Terry. He has taken the most wickets in T20 matches by a player who has only played T20 cricket for one team.

As a youngster Wood was a talented sportsman, playing as a striker for the Manor Colts football team in Alton, Hampshire.

Wood attended Amery Hill School and Alton College. Wood has spoken about his addiction to gambling. 

He is married to Lucy, the daughter of Rod Bransgrove. Early in 2020, Lucy gave birth to Isabella.

In April 2022, he was bought by the London Spirit for the 2022 season of The Hundred.

References

External links

1990 births
Living people
Cricketers from Basingstoke
English cricketers
Hampshire cricketers
London Spirit cricketers